Ionian school or Heptanese school may refer to:

In ancient Ionia (Greek Ιωνία)
 Ionian School (philosophy), school of thought

In modern Ionian Islands (Greek Ιόνια νησιά)
 Ionian School (painting) or Heptanese School, art movement from the 17th to 19th centuries
 Ionian School (literature) or Heptanese School, art movement from the 18th and 19th centuries
 Ionian School (music) or Heptanese School, art movement from the 19th and 20th centuries

See also 
 Ionian Academy
 Ionian University